Andraca draco is a moth of the family Endromidae. It is found on Java.

The wingspan is 44–45 mm for males and about 59 mm for females. The forewings are dark brown, with brown wavy and concave transversal fasciae and distinct whitish to bluish suffusion. The discal spot is small and point-like and suffused with light scales. The hindwings are lighter, with a dark yellowish-brown costal area and indistinct yellowish shadows in anal area. Adults are on wing from February to July, probably in multiple generations per year.

References

Moths described in 2012
Andraca